Jhoola is a village in the Nicobar district of Andaman and Nicobar Islands, India. It is located in the Nancowry tehsil.

Demographics 

The village was severely affected by the 2004 Indian Ocean earthquake and tsunami, and nearly vanished from the map. By the time of the 2011 census of India, Jhoola had only 1 surviving household. The effective literacy rate (i.e. the literacy rate of population excluding children aged 6 and below) is 75%.

References 

Villages in Nancowry tehsil